Paradise is a 1975 Australian TV movie produced by Robert Bruning and directed by Bill Hughes.

Plot
Faulkner, a private detective on the Gold Coast, investigates a murder.

Cast
Michael Beecher as Faulkner
Tina Grenville 		
Eric Oldfield
Ingrid Mason 		
Alan Wilson 		
Sheila Helpmann 		
George Haywood 		
Donald Dale 		
Peter Dair 		
William Evans 		
Leo Wockner 		
Will Fehres 		
Frank Geary 		
Elaine Rees 		
Pete Windsor 		
Hazel Howson
Robert Bruning

Production
It was produced by Robert Bruning an actor who had produced several TV series. He wanted to move into TV movie production and succeeded in selling Paradise to Channel Nine, who were considering making it a 26-episode series. According to the Sydney Morning Herald the network hoped the film "to be a slick, glossy offering along the lines of Banacek."

It was shot in Surfers Paradise, with Bruning using several collaborators he had worked with on his TV shows such as director Bill Hughes. Bruning called the final movie "a terrible thing... I would like to forget it" but managed to sell it outright to Paramount, who showed the film in prime time syndication on American TV. It was the only one of his TV films he sold outright. Bruning's experience on the movie enabled him to make Is There Anybody There? which he called "the first of the true all-film telefeatures."

The film aired again on Channel 9 in 1976.

References

External links

Paradise at BFI
Paradise at National Film and Sound Archive

1975 television films
1975 films
1970s English-language films
Australian television films
Australian thriller films